Woo Do-hwan (born July 12, 1992) is a South Korean actor.
He is best known for his roles in the television dramas Save Me (2017), Mad Dog (2017), Tempted (2018), My Country: The New Age (2019), and The King: Eternal Monarch (2020). He also appeared in the film The Divine Fury (2019).

Early life and education
Woo was born on July 12, 1992 in Anyang, Gyeonggi Province. He graduated from Dankook University, majoring in performance and film.

Personal life 
Woo began his mandatory military service on July 6, 2020. By attending six weeks of training as a company commander intern in the recruit training course. Graduated as a student leader at the 1st Department of Transportation Training. Woo was discharged from military service on January 5, 2022, not returning to the unit after his final vacation in accordance with the rules of the Ministry of Defense of the Republic of Korea.

Filmography

Film

Television series

Web series

Awards and nominations

References

External links
 
 
 

1992 births
Living people
People from Anyang, Gyeonggi
People from Gyeonggi Province
Dankook University alumni
21st-century South Korean male actors
South Korean male film actors
South Korean male television actors